Bamifylline is a drug of the xanthine chemical class which acts as a selective adenosine A1 receptor antagonist.

See also 
 Theophylline
 Caffeine

References 

Adenosine receptor antagonists
Enones
Primary alcohols
Xanthines